The following is a list of women's international rugby union matches with non-test status.

The list includes:
Matches involving designated national "A" teams,
Matches of doubtful status,
Matches between full international sides and non-national XVs, and
Other games of note.

It is included as some nations have awarded full caps for these games and may include them as full internationals in their own records. In addition these games act as an indicator of the relative strength of some of the smaller nations, and the strength in depth of the larger.

1990

1991

1995

1996

1997

2000

2001

2002

2003

2004

2005

2006

2007

2008

2009

2010

2011

2012

2013

2014

2015

2016

2017

References

Sources of results
The above results have been traced mainly via the following listings of national and tournament results - most being national RFUs. Other results have been traced via numerous news reports.
Australia (complete, some errors in dates)
England (1998-)
FIRA European Championships (2003-)
France (1982-2004)
France (1990-)
Germany (rather incomplete)
International Rugby Board (2006-, Six Nations and World Cup only)
Japan (1994-2002)
Netherlands (2003-)
Norway (2002-)
New Zealand (1991- )
RBS Six Nations (2004-)
Sweden (1984-2005)
USA (complete, some errors)
Wales (1987-, some gaps, some errors)

 
Rugby union-related lists
Rugby union, international matches without test status